Ewden Valley is a valley  in the civil parish of Bradfield in the Stocksbridge and Upper Don electoral ward of Sheffield, South Yorkshire, England.

Ewden Village is located between the Moor Hall and Broomhead reservoirs, close to and south of Bolsterstone, within the civil parish of Stocksbridge. Work on the construction of the two reservoirs was started by Sheffield Corporation in 1913. The reservoirs' construction site was served by the now closed Ewden Railway which connected with the Great Central Railway's Woodhead line in Wharncliffe Wood. A timber built village was constructed to house workers working on the Morehall and Broomhead reservoirs. The village was completed in 1929. By 1969 only 15 of over 70 buildings were occupied, and by the 21st century the village was practically abandoned. By 2008 a single worker's cottage remained from the original navvy village.

Ewden Beck flows from Broomhead Moor, eastwards, supplying the Broomhead reservoir. Excess outfall flows into the River Don.

See also 

 Broomhead Hall

References

Former populated places in South Yorkshire
Geography of Sheffield
History of Sheffield
Villages of the metropolitan borough of Sheffield